Oscar Centurión (born 24 January 1986 in Asunción, Paraguay) is a Paraguayan footballer currently playing for Deportes Copiapó of the Primera B Chilena.

Teams
  Olimpia 2004–2006
  Sol de América 2007–2008
  San José 2009
  Sol de América 2009–2010
  Deportes Copiapó 2011–2012
  El Porvenir 2013
  Deportivo Quevedo 2015

References
 

1986 births
Living people
Paraguayan footballers
Paraguayan expatriate footballers
Club Olimpia footballers
Club Sol de América footballers
Club San José players
Deportes Copiapó footballers
Expatriate footballers in Chile
Expatriate footballers in Bolivia
Association footballers not categorized by position